Ium may refer to:
Ium (Greece), a town of ancient Laconia, Greece
-ium, a systematic naming of chemical elements

See also
IUM (disambiguation)